The 2003 Chrono des Herbiers was the 22nd edition of the Chrono des Nations cycle race and was held on 19 October 2003. The race started and finished in Les Herbiers. The race was won by Michael Rich.

General classification

References

2003
2003 in road cycling
2003 in French sport
October 2003 sports events in France